Pekuakamiulnuatsh First Nation or Première Nation des Pekuakamiulnuatsh in French, is a First Nation of Canada. The Nation is based on its reserve of Mashteuiatsh, in the Saguenay–Lac-Saint-Jean region of Quebec.

References

External links
 
 
 
 Location and map: 

First Nations in Quebec
Communities in Saguenay–Lac-Saint-Jean
Innu